Anders Wiberg (17 July 1816 – 5 November 1887) was a preacher, missionary, and leader of the early Swedish Baptist movement.

Life

Early life and influences 
Wiberg was born on 17 July 1816 in Vi in Hälsingtuna parish, Hälsingland, Sweden. He was educated at Uppsala University and became a priest in the Church of Sweden. The growing pietist and Reader (läsare) movements in the Scandinavian countries were an influence on him. Wiberg, like fellow Lutheran-turned-Baptist-pioneer Gustaf Palmquist, was a friend of pietist preacher Carl Olof Rosenius. He was also influenced by Methodist missionary George Scott and Lars Vilhelm Henschen, a champion of religious freedom. Wiberg later came to know several of the figures in the growing Baptist revival movement and his views on the state church became more skeptical. Wiberg has been called the "pivotal link to the New World" and "in some ways a piece of ideological blotting paper" due to his connections with so many key figures in the Reader movement. After a visit to preacher Johann Gerhard Oncken in Hamburg in 1851, Wiberg came to agree with Baptist teachings regarding baptism.

Wiberg's influence 
He developed his teachings on baptism in the book ? ('Who should be baptized and what does baptism consist of?') in 1852, which sparked a fierce debate in which Lars Anton Anjou,  and Fredrik Gabriel Hedberg made high-profile contributions. The same year, on his journey to the United States, he was baptized by F. O. Nilsson in Copenhagen.

Wiberg spent three years in the United States to learn more about the Baptist movement there. He was ordained in New York in the Baptist Mariner's Church and then worked for the American Baptist Publication Society. While in Philadelphia, he married Caroline Lintemuth. Wiberg returned to Sweden in 1855 to find his writings had contributed to the movement's growth; there were now 500 Swedish Baptists, with 800 to 1000 formal conversions a year. He became leader of the first Baptist church in Stockholm, which had been founded the year before. He began intensive work to strengthen the new movement throughout the country. Among his collaborators were brothers Johannes, Per, and Gustaf Palmquist. A confession of faith written by Wiberg was adopted, a training course for preachers was begun, and from 1856 the new movement had its own publication, edited by Wiberg. The publication and Wiberg's colporteur work were to play a large role in the spread of Baptist churches in Norway and Finland as well; his writings were brought to Åland and contributed to the start of the early Finnish Baptist movement. He also baptized some of the early founders of Baptist churches in Finland, siblings Viktor and Anna Heikel.

In 1858, the Conventicle Act, which outlawed religious meetings other than those of the Lutheran Church of Sweden, was overturned. By the following year, the Baptists had grown to a total of 4,311 members in 95 churches, and almost 6,000 members in 1863.

Baptist Union and seminary 
Wiberg was one of the leaders who worked to gather the Swedish Baptist churches for their first general conference in 1857; this was to become the Baptist Union of Sweden in 1889. Speakers at the second conference included key Baptist figures Julius Köbner, John Howard Hinton, and Edward Steane. In 1866, the conference established a seminary, Bethel Seminary, which he raised funds for through the American Baptist Missionary Union.

Death 
Wiberg died 5 November 1887 in Stockholm.

Works 
 ? (1852, Uppsala)
  (1854, Philadelphia)
  (1855, Philadelphia) (also printed in Stockholm)
  (1869)
  (1879)
  (1880)

See also 

 Radical Pietism

 Oscar Broady – contemporaneous Swedish Baptist missionary
 John Alexis Edgren – contemporaneous Swedish Baptist missionary

References 

1816 births
1887 deaths
19th-century Baptist ministers
Swedish-language writers
Swedish writers
Swedish Baptist missionaries
Writers from Hälsingland
Converts to Baptist denominations
Radical Pietism